Gonatopus is a genus of flowering plants in the family Araceae, consisting of about five species. This genus is native to eastern and southeastern Africa and is closely related to the genus Zamioculcas. The plant generally only produces one leaf from its tuber when in growth. In G. boivinii, the leaf is tripinnate, and with its stalk can reach up to 1 m in height and 40 cm broad; the individual leaflets are up to 10 cm long and 3.5 cm broad; in G. angustus, the leaf can reach 1.5 m tall. A spadix arises from the tuber during late spring.

Cultivation and uses
The most commonly found Gonatopus in private collections and cultivation is Gonatopus boivinii, commonly called giraffe's knees. This name arises from the appearance of a swollen region of a petiole called the pulvinus.

Since Gonatopus boivinii is tropical in origin, in temperate areas it should be grown as a houseplant. As an ornamental plant, it is grown for its attractive mottled leaves and stalk. Potting soil with some coir incorporated is satisfactory for the plant. The plant should be kept moist and fertilized once every two weeks with a weak fertilizer during the growing season.

The plants should be kept warm, and in bright light or light shade. After the growing season, the tubers can be lifted and stored like dahlias. The plant can be propagated by division or by seed.

Selected species
Gonatopus angustus N.E.Br.
Gonatopus boivinii (Decne) Engl.
Gonatopus clavatus Mayo
Gonatopus marattioides (A. Peter) Bogner
Gonatopus petiolulatus (A. Peter) Bogner

References
International Aroid Society
first description of Zamioculcas boivinii (=Gonatopus b.) by J. Decaisne (1870), Bull. Soc. Bot. France 17, 320-321. (French and Latin)
generic description of Gonatopus (Hook.f.) Engl. by A. Engler (1879), DC. Mon. Phan. II. 63; 208. (Latin)
first description of Gonatopus angustus by N. E. Brown (1901), Bull. Herb. Boissier II, 1: 778. (Latin and German)
Description from A. Engler (1905), Das Pflanzenreich IV. 23 B (Heft 21): 304-308. (Latin and German)
first description of Heterolobium petiolulatum (=Gonatopus p.) by A. Peter (1930), Nachr. Ges. Wiss. Göttingen 1929, Math.-Phys. Kl. 3: 221-222. (Latin and German)
first description of Microculcas marattioides (=Gonatopus m.) by A. Peter (1930), Nachr. Ges. Wiss. Göttingen 1929, Math.-Phys. Kl. 3: 222-225. (Latin and German)
Plant of the Week
University of Connecticut

External links

Araceae
Araceae genera